Brent Jamin Budowsky (born February 29, 1952) is an American political opinion writer and columnist for The Hill.

Education
Budowsky attended Seaford High School in Seaford, New York. Budowsky received his Bachelor of Arts degree from George Washington University. He completed a J.D. from the Columbus School of Law of Catholic University, which included participation in the law program of St Edmund Hall at Oxford University, and an LL.M. from the London School of Economics.

Career
From the mid-1970s to 1990, Budowsky served in senior congressional staff positions including legislative assistant to former Senator Lloyd Bentsen; extensively involved with the Intelligence Identities Protection Act and Intelligence Officers Death Benefits Act, and legislative director to Representative Bill Alexander, then the Chief Deputy Majority Whip.

He is described as liberal.

References

External links

Budowsky at The Hill’s Pundits Blog
Budowsky at The Huffington Post

Employees of the United States Congress
Living people
George Washington University alumni
Columbus School of Law alumni
Alumni of the London School of Economics
American male journalists
Journalists from Washington, D.C.
Washington, D.C., Democrats
1952 births
American political writers
20th-century American journalists